Santos González Capilla (born 17 December 1973) is a Spanish professional road bicycle racer. Being a time trial specialist, he won the Spanish National Time Trial Championship in 1999 and 2001. In 2000 he won a stage in Vuelta a España, where he finished fourth. He also rode at the 1992 Summer Olympics and the 2000 Summer Olympics.

Major results

1999
  Time Trial Champion
2000
 1st, Stage 1, Vuelta a Castilla y León
 4th, Overall, Vuelta a España
 Winner Stage 21 (ITT)
 8th, Olympic Games, Time Trial
2001
  Time Trial Champion
 7th, World Time Trial Championship
2003
 11th, Vuelta a España
2005
 2nd, National Time Trial Championship

References

External links

1973 births
Living people
People from Crevillent
Sportspeople from the Province of Alicante
Cyclists from the Valencian Community
Cyclists at the 1992 Summer Olympics
Cyclists at the 2000 Summer Olympics
Olympic cyclists of Spain
Spanish Vuelta a España stage winners
Spanish male cyclists
20th-century Spanish people
21st-century Spanish people